The Breed of the Treshams is a 1920 British silent adventure film directed by Kenelm Foss and starring Mary Odette, Hayford Hobbs and A. B. Imeson. During the English Civil War, the Royalists uncover a Roundhead spy.

Cast
 Mary Odette as Margaret Hungerford  
 Hayford Hobbs as Hon. Francis Tresham 
 A. B. Imeson as Hon. Clement Hungerford  
 Charles Vane as Vis. Dorsington 
 Margot Drake as Margaret 
 Fred Morgan as Capt. Rashleigh  
 Gordon Craig as Batty  
 Will Corrie as Cpl. Lumsford 
 Philip Hewland as Col. Henry Curwen  
 Nelson Ramsey as Col. Bagshawe 
 Norman Tharp as Capt. Stanhope  
 Farmer Skein as Lord Tresham  
 Gwen Williams as Mrs. Bagshawe 
 C.R. Foster-Kemp as Child  
 John Martin Harvey as Lt. Rat Reresby

References

Bibliography
 Low, Rachael. History of the British Film, 1918-1929. George Allen & Unwin, 1971.

External links

1920 films
1920s war adventure films
1920s historical adventure films
British silent feature films
British war adventure films
British historical adventure films
Films directed by Kenelm Foss
British films based on plays
Films set in England
Films set in the 1640s
British black-and-white films
1920s English-language films
1920s British films
Silent historical adventure films
Silent war adventure films